Ozark Township is a defunct township in Webster County, in the U.S. state of Missouri.

Ozark Township was formed May 22, 1855, taking its name from the range of the same name.

References

Townships in Missouri
Townships in Webster County, Missouri